Äppelknyckarjazz is the debut studio album by Swedish hip hop swing band Movits!. It was released on November 26, 2008 in Sweden and digitally on July 29, 2009 in USA. The title translates to English as "Apple Swiper Jazz" or more interpretively "Jazz For Apple Thieves" or "Music For Market Thieves".

Track listing

Charts

References

2009 debut albums
Swedish-language albums